Ulul Azmi (born July 8, 2000) is an Indonesian professional footballer who plays as a forward.

Club career

Borneo
He made his professional debut in the Liga 1 on 3 July 2019, against Kalteng Putra.

Career statistics

Club

Notes

References

External links
 Ulul Azmi at Liga Indonesia
 Ulul Azmi at Soccerway

2000 births
Living people
Indonesian footballers
Borneo F.C. players
Association football forwards
People from Bukittinggi
Sportspeople from West Sumatra